Brachychloa is a genus of African plants in the grass family, native to Mozambique and South Africa.

 Species
 Brachychloa fragilis S.M.Phillips - Mozambique, Limpopo, Kwazulu-Natal
 Brachychloa schiemanniana (Schweick.) S.M.Phillips - Mozambique, Kwazulu-Natal

References

Chloridoideae
Poaceae genera
Flora of Southern Africa